Enekbatus sessilis is a shrub endemic to Western Australia.

It blooms between August and September producing white-pink-purple flowers.

It is found on sand plains and flats in the Mid West and Wheatbelt regions of Western Australia between Northampton and Dalwallinu where it grows in sandy-loamy-clay soils containing gravel over laterite or sandstone.

References

sessilis
Endemic flora of Western Australia
Myrtales of Australia
Rosids of Western Australia
Plants described in 2010
Taxa named by Barbara Lynette Rye
Taxa named by Malcolm Eric Trudgen